This is a list of diplomatic missions in Azerbaijan. At present, the capital city of Baku hosts 63 embassies.

Embassies 
Baku

Missions/Representative Offices 
Baku
 (Delegation)
 (Russia)
 (Embassy Office)
 (Turkey) (Representative Office)
 (Economic Office)
 (Russia)

Gallery

Consulates-General

Non-resident embassies accredited to Azerbaijan 

Resident in Ankara, Turkey

Resident in Moscow

Resident in Tehran, Iran

Resident in other cities

 (Geneva)
 (Brasilia)
 (Seoul)
 (Helsinki)
 (Abu Dhabi)
 (Valletta)
 (London)
 (Abu Dhabi)

Former embassies

Embassies to open

See also 
 Foreign relations of Azerbaijan
 List of diplomatic missions of Azerbaijan
 Visa requirements for Azerbaijani citizens

References

External links 
 Republic of Azerbaijan Ministry of Foreign Affairs 
 Republic of Azerbaijan Ministry of Foreign Affairs, List of Diplomatic Missions in Azerbaijan 

Diplomatic missions in Azerbaijan
Diplomatic missions in Azerbaijan
Azerbaijan